CA-26 may refer to:
California's 26th congressional district
California State Route 26
, a World War II heavy cruiser